Yarım Ay (Turkish: Yarım Ay, English: Half Moon), a family and youth journal, was published between 1935 and 1940 - with some exceptions - on the 1st and the 15th of each month in Istanbul. A total of 123 issues were edited. The owner of the magazine was the Resimli Ay Matbaası T.L.S. which was also responsible for the printing, with Emin Refik Müslümoğlu as editor-in-chief. Among other topics, the magazine supported the women's emancipation as well as changes in lifestyle of that time, such as the transformation of male and female clothing in modern Turkey in the 1930s into a simple, secular style of dress according to Kemalist ideology.

References

1935 establishments in Turkey
1940 disestablishments in Turkey
Biweekly magazines published in Turkey
Defunct literary magazines
Defunct magazines published in Turkey
Lifestyle magazines published in Turkey
Literary magazines published in Turkey
Magazines established in 1935
Magazines disestablished in 1940
Magazines published in Istanbul
Turkish-language magazines
Youth magazines